Poul Laurits Hansen (5 February 1916 – 15 March 2002) was a Danish amateur footballer, who played 25 games for the Denmark national football team as a defender from November 1935 to September 1946. Born in Copenhagen, Hansen spent his club career with B 93. He died on 15 March 2002 in Gentofte.

References

1916 births
2002 deaths
Danish men's footballers
Denmark international footballers
Boldklubben af 1893 players
Association football defenders
Footballers from Copenhagen